Carolyn Kieger (born August 17, 1983) is the head women's college basketball coach for the Pennsylvania State University Lady Lions basketball team. Formerly, she was the head coach for her alma mater, the Marquette Golden Eagles, from 2014 to 2019.

Playing career
Kieger was born in Roseville, Minnesota. She attended college at Marquette University, where she was a four-year starter for the Golden Eagles, a three-year captain and is still their all-time assists leader. Kieger is the only player in program history with at least 1,200 career points, 400 career rebounds and 600 assists. Careerwise, she averaged 10.3 points per game and was a second team All-Big East Conference selection for the 2005–06 season, as well as, a second team All-Conference USA selection for the 2003–04 and 2004–05 seasons. During her senior year, she was a finalist for the Nancy Lieberman Award. In 2006, she graduated cum laude from Marquette with a bachelor's degree in broadcasting and electronic communications.

Marquette statistics

Source

Coaching career
Kieger spent six seasons as the assistant coach at the University of Miami. She primarily focused on developing players in the guard position. In April 2014, Marquette decided to not renew Terri Mitchell's contract after 18 years. The search began for a new head coach. With Kieger's standout player career in Marquette and her having worked as its director of operations from 2007 to 2008, she was hired for the position.

Head coaching record

References

1983 births
Living people
American women's basketball coaches
American women's basketball players
Basketball coaches from Minnesota
Basketball players from Minnesota
Marquette Golden Eagles women's basketball coaches
Marquette Golden Eagles women's basketball players
Miami Hurricanes women's basketball coaches
Penn State Lady Lions basketball coaches
People from Roseville, Minnesota
Sportspeople from the Minneapolis–Saint Paul metropolitan area
Point guards